Gender-neutral language in Portuguese is a recent strand of demands for greater gender equality and social inclusion between men, women and non-binary individuals. It can be divided into inclusive or non-sexist language, and non-binary or neuter language or neolanguage. Inclusive language aims to use existing words to include all genders, while neuter language uses new or modified words to accomplish this.

Context 
Most words in Portuguese have one grammatical gender, the masculine or the feminine. The creation of gender-neutral terms and removal of gender markers aims to make non-binary people feel included.

Proposals

Agreement 

One of the proposal is using metonymy, periphrasis and circumlocution following agreement, sometimes including the usage of people-first language, whereas the word  has feminine grammatical gender with no natural gender markedness, similar with the usage of no pronouns in English, a form of gender omission. Many nouns and adjectives are referred as "uniforms", which are words that can be used to refer to people of any gender, they are not necessarily neutral but are useful for an inclusive language. This proposal is known as gender-inclusive language or gender-neutral syntax.

-x and @ 
These forms are not pronounceable, they are meant to be graphical, being criticized for not being readable by screen readers and seen as potentially ableist. The use of at signs are recorded since 1990s, such as in words "Unid@s" (United).

Neopronouns 
Portuguese neopronouns are a gender-neutral approach to pronominal reference to living things, especially humans. They are neopronouns, i.e. a newly developed, intentional innovation of language (as opposed to natural language change).

Depending on the ungendered neopronoun one identifies with (e.g. ), there are various suggestions. Elo, for example, is recorded since 1970s to describe travestis. See the below table with suggestions for various inflections of some neopronouns:

Neolanguage 
Neolanguage stands for neologistic desinences, articles, nouns and declesions along with pronouns. Neolinguistic terms can be used for groups of multiple genders or non-binary individuals, for example.

Further reading

See also 

Neuter (grammar)
Epicenity
Gender-neutral language
Gender neutrality in languages with gendered third-person pronouns
Gender neutrality in languages with grammatical gender
Gender neutrality in Spanish
Elle (Spanish pronoun)
Gender reform in Esperanto
Ri (pronoun)
Hen (pronoun)
Iel (pronoun)
Latinx
Portuguese grammar
Personal pronouns in Portuguese

References 

Gender-neutral pronouns
Gender-neutral language
Portuguese language